Helena Vildová (born 19 March 1972) is a retired Czech tennis player.

In her career, she won three doubles titles on the WTA Tour. On 15 January 1996, she reached her best singles ranking of world No. 188. On 3 November 1997, she peaked at No. 39 in the WTA doubles rankings.

Vildová retired from professional tennis in 2001.

WTA career finals

Doubles: 6 (3 titles, 3 runner-ups)

ITF Circuit finals

Singles: 6 (3–3)

Doubles: 44 (28–16)

References

External links
 
 

1972 births
Living people
Czech female tennis players
Czechoslovak female tennis players